Malta Polar may refer to:

 A non-alcoholic malt beverage brewed and bottled in Venezuela by Cervecería Polar (part of Empresas Polar) and in the United States by the Florida Brewery (also known as Maltín Polar)
 Malta Polar, a Peruvian Schwarzbier brewed by Backus and Johnston; now known as Pilsner Polar
 Malta (drink), a non-alcoholic malt beverage